Live Recordings 2004 is the first EP by English alternative rock band Keane, first released in late spring 2005 (see 2005 in music). Six songs are featured on the record, recorded during the first part of the Hopes and Fears Tour. All tracks appear on the band's debut album, Hopes and Fears, excepting "Allemande" which appeared on the "This Is the Last Time" first version single.

It was only released in the following countries:
 Austria
 Belgium
 Canada
 Czech Republic
 France (Only with Hopes and Fears)
 Germany
 Hungary
 Iceland
 Ireland
 Italy
 Mexico
 the Netherlands
 Norway
 Spain
 Switzerland
 UK (Very rare, only selected shops imported from Germany)

There was a competition to win a limited edition DVD containing Keane videos. The details were included in the inner cover of the album.

Track listing 

Keane (band) albums
2005 debut EPs
Live EPs